The 600th (Russian) Infantry Division was a military division that was formed by the German Army during the Second World War.  It drew its men from Russian prisoners of war and forced laborers.

History
The division was established on 1 December 1944 and was also known as the 1st Infantry Division of the Russian Liberation Army.
The division was built up in Münsingen and was formally part of the Ersatzheer, the reserve army of the Wehrmacht, during the build-up period. On 28 January 1945, when construction was completed, the command was handed over to the Committee for the Liberation of the Peoples of Russia (KONR), which was granted the status of ally. In Andrei Vlasov, the army of the KONR, the VS KONR, had its own commander-in-chief and thus an independent position with regard to the Wehrmacht.

The core of the division was formed by remnants of the abolished 29th Russian SS Waffen-Grenadier-Division and 30th Russian SS Waffen-Grenadier-Division. This was supplemented by thirteen Russian battalions of the Wehrmacht and a large number of former prisoners of war and forced laborers. At full strength, the division had 18,000 men and was equipped with, among other things, a number of T-34 tanks, Jagdpanzer 38(t) tank hunters, a few armored vehicles and various types of artillery guns.

As a fire baptism, a small detachment from the 1st Division was successfully deployed in February 1945 against Soviet troops at Neulewin on the Oder. In March the entire division was moved to the Oderfront, where the Red Army threatened to break through.
At the beginning of April the division arrived in the area of Heeresgruppe Weichsel, where it launched an attack on the Red Army at Erlenhof on 13 April, supported by the VS-KONR air force. When the attack got stuck within a few hours and the division had lost about 370 men, division commander Sergei Bunyachenko decided to move south, to the area between Linz and Budweis, where Vlasov wanted to concentrate his troops. 

At the beginning of May the division stopped in the Czech city of Kozojedy, about 50 kilometers east of Prague. Here, Bunyachenko was approached by representatives of the Czech resistance, who prepared an uprising in Prague to expel the Germans from the city. The uprising broke out on May 5 and was assisted by the 1st Division the next day without the knowledge of Vlasov. In the fighting with German troops, around 300 soldiers from the division were killed. Although thanks to the Russians most of the city could be freed, their help aroused the anger of the Czech Communists, who demanded that they surrender to the Red Army.
 
On May 7, the division withdrew westward from Prague. The next day Germany capitulated. The division finally tried to surrender to the Americans, who, in spite of international law, extradited the Russians to the Soviet Union, where the soldiers ended up in Gulag camps. Boenjatshenko was hanged after a sham trial, just like the other KONR leaders, on 1 August 1946.

Commanders 
 Generalleutnant Sergei Bunyachenko : 10 November 1944 - 8 May 1945

See also 
Ostlegionen

Sources 
600. Infanterie-Division - Article on www.lexikon-der-wehrmacht.de
600. Infanterie-Division - Article on Axishistory.com

Foreign volunteer units of the Wehrmacht
Infantry divisions of Germany during World War II
Military units and formations established in 1944
Military units and formations disestablished in 1945
Russian collaborators with Nazi Germany
Russian Liberation Army